Panagiotis Goutsidis (born 8 June 1965) is a Greek professional football manager and former player.

References

1965 births
Living people
Greek football managers
Xanthi F.C. managers
Anagennisi Giannitsa F.C. managers
Panegialios F.C. managers
People from Rhodope (regional unit)
Footballers from Eastern Macedonia and Thrace